Marcus Powlowski (born January 20, 1960) is a Canadian Member of Parliament who was elected to represent the riding of Thunder Bay—Rainy River in the 2019 Canadian federal election. Powlowski was also named a chief in Ambae, Vanuatu with the title of Vera Liu. He is married to Mirasol Añora Powlowski and has six children.

Education
Powlowski holds a Bachelor of Science in Biochemistry and Medical Doctorate from the University of Toronto. He also holds a Bachelor of Law from the University of Toronto, as well as a master's degree in Public Health (Health Law and Policy) from Harvard University and a master's degree in Global Health Law from Georgetown University.

Professional Experience 
Before his election in 2019, Marcus Powlowski served in several roles, most recently as an emergency room doctor at the Thunder Bay Regional Health Sciences Centre and associate professor of medicine, Northern Ontario School of Medicine. Powlowski also practiced medicine for two years in Northern Canadian First Nations communities and for seven years in Swaziland, The Gambia, Papua New Guinea, and Vanuatu. He has also worked for the World Health Organization as a health legislation consultant and taught Global Health at Lakehead University and University of San Francisco, and Global Health Law at Lakehead University Faculty of Law.

Political Roles 
After assuming office as the Member of Parliament for Thunder Bay—Rainy River in 2019, Powlowski was named to the Standing Committees on Health, as well as the Indigenous and Northern Affairs. Powlowski has been an outspoken advocate for the use of human challenge trials for vaccine development during the COVID-19 pandemic.

The Hill Times named Powlowski as one of the 25 MP's to watch during the Fall 2020 session of Parliament, mainly due to his advocacy work in public healthcare during COVID-19.

Electoral record

References

External links

Living people
Canadian people of Polish descent
Liberal Party of Canada MPs
Members of the House of Commons of Canada from Ontario
Politicians from Thunder Bay
1960 births
Lakehead University alumni
University of Toronto alumni
Georgetown University Law Center alumni
Harvard School of Public Health alumni